Heroine (original Spanish title: Heroína) is a 2005 Spanish drama film directed by Gerardo Herrero. It stars Adriana Ozores as Pilar.

Cast
Adriana Ozores as Pilar
Javier Pereira as Fito
Carlos Blanco as Germán
María Bouzas as Fina
Luis Iglesia as Juanjo
César Cambeiro as José
Camila Bossa as Gloria
Víctor Vázquez as Manuel
Miguel Bua as Esteban
Carlos Sante as Doro
Tatán as Antón
Lois Soaxe as Legionario
Rosa Álvarez as Teresa
Tamara Canosa as Nati
Alberte Cabarcos as Kiko

See also 
 List of Spanish films of 2005

External links

2005 films
2000s Spanish-language films
2005 drama films
Films directed by Gerardo Herrero
Spanish drama films
Films scored by Lucio Godoy
Tornasol Films films
2000s Spanish films